Suisun Bay (Wintun for "where the west wind blows") is a shallow tidal estuary (a northeastern extension of the San Francisco Bay) in Northern California. It lies at the confluence of the Sacramento River and San Joaquin River, forming the entrance to the Sacramento–San Joaquin River Delta, an inverted river delta. To the west, Suisun Bay is drained by the Carquinez Strait, which connects to San Pablo Bay, a northern extension of San Francisco Bay. Suisun Marsh, the tidal marsh land to the north, is the largest marsh in California. Grizzly Bay forms a northern extension of Suisun Bay. Suisun Bay is directly north of Contra Costa County.

The bay was named in 1811, after the Suisunes, a Patwin tribe of Wintun Indians.

The Central Pacific Railroad built a train ferry that operated between Benicia and Port Costa, California, from 1879 to 1930. The ferry boats Solano and Contra Costa were removed from service when the nearby Martinez railroad bridge was completed in 1930. From 1913 until 1954 the Sacramento Northern Railway, an electrified interurban line, crossed Suisun Bay with the Ramon, a distillate-powered train ferry.

On April 28, 2004, a petroleum pipeline operated by Kinder Morgan Energy Partners ruptured, initially reported as spilling 1,500 barrels (264m³) of diesel fuel in the marshes, but, this was later updated to about 2,950 barrels. Kinder Morgan pleaded guilty to operating a corroded pipeline (and cited for failing to notify authorities quickly after the spill was discovered) and paid three million dollars in penalties and restitution.

Geography

Suisun Bay Reserve Fleet
The bay was the anchorage of the Suisun Bay Reserve Fleet, a part of the US Navy Mothball or Ghost Fleet, a collection of U.S. Navy and merchant reserve ships which was created in the period following World War II. The USNS Glomar Explorer was anchored here after recovering parts of a sunken Soviet submarine in the mid-1970s (see Project Azorian). Many ships were removed and sold for scrap in the 1990s. In 2010, plans were announced to remove the oldest remaining parts of the Suisun Bay mothball fleet in stages.  The last of the 57 ships in the old Mothball Fleet were removed in August 2017. There are still a number of naval ships in Suisun Bay. Most are part of the Military Sealift Command Ready Reserve Fleet.

See also

San Francisco Bay
Grizzly Bay
Stockton Deepwater Shipping Channel
Sacramento Deep Water Ship Channel

References

External links
Kinder Morgan Information Regarding Pipeline Release

Bays of California
Bays of San Francisco Bay
Bays of Contra Costa County, California
Bodies of water of Solano County, California
Sacramento–San Joaquin River Delta
San Joaquin River
Tributaries of San Pablo Bay
Carquinez Strait
Landforms of the San Francisco Bay Area
Subregions of the San Francisco Bay Area
Ship graveyards